Potami is a small village near Nicosia with a population of approximately 558 people. Legend says that the village was created by a king who was buried in the village in a golden carriage. The name of the village probably comes from the two rivers which the village is built between.

References

Communities in Nicosia District